SS Gallic was a cargo steamship built in 1918. During her career, she had six different owners and sailed under the flags of the United Kingdom, Panama and Indonesia. She underwent seven name changes during her 37-year career. She was scrapped at Hong Kong in 1956, the last surviving White Star Line cargo ship.

Career
Owing to the First World War and the increased demand for cargo vessels, the British government set into motion a programme to rapidly build emergency cargo ships. Of those, 22 of the Standard "G" Type were ultimately built. Among those was the SS War Argus, built for HM Shipping Controller by Workman, Clark & Co. of Belfast in 1918. She was launched on 19 October and completed on 12 December, a month after the end of the war. She was then operated by the White Star Line for the government until she was officially declared surplus in 1919. In August 1919, the War Argus was purchased by White Star and renamed SS Gallic.

The Gallic then served on the Australian service as a cargo vessel, and was later switched to Atlantic cargo service. As a result of the Depression and the merger of White Star with the Cunard Line, in October 1933 the Gallic was sold to the Clan Line and renamed Clan Colquhoun. She continued her service on the same Atlantic route for the next 14 years. During the Second World War, she was operated by the Ministry of War Transport as a refrigerated cargo carrier; unlike many other cargo steamers, she survived the war without incident.

In February 1947, the Clan Colquhoun was sold to the Zarati Steamship Co. of Panama and renamed Ioannis Livanos. However, her new owners sold her in 1949 to another Panamanian shipping company, the Two Oceans Navigation Company SA (Dos Oceanos Compania de Navegacion SA), which renamed her Jenny. In 1951, she was sold to Djakarta Lloyd NV of Indonesia, which renamed her Imam Bondjal, but changed this to Djatinegra in 1952. In 1955, after 37 years of service, she was sold to Japanese breakers for scrapping. While under tow from Djakarta to Osaka, on 1 December 1955 the Djatinegra was forced to put in at Lingayen in the Philippines with her engine room flooded. She was refloated on 21 February 1956 and was scrapped at Hong Kong shortly after.

References

1918 ships
Standard World War I ships
Ships of the White Star Line
Steamships of the United Kingdom
Merchant ships of the United Kingdom
Ministry of War Transport ships
Steamships of Panama
Merchant ships of Panama
Steamships of Indonesia
Merchant ships of Indonesia
Ships built in Belfast